Buffalo bean is a common name for several plants and may refer to:

 Buffalo bean (Thermopsis rhombifolia)
 Buffalo bean (Mucuna pruriens)